An All-American team is an honorary sports team composed of the best amateur players of a specific season for each team position—who in turn are given the honorific "All-America" and typically referred to as "All-American athletes", or simply "All-Americans". Although the honorees generally do not compete together as a unit, the term is used in U.S. team sports to refer to players who are selected by members of the national media. Walter Camp selected the first All-America team in the early days of American football in 1889. The 2020 NCAA Women's Basketball All-Americans are honorary lists that include All-American selections from the Associated Press (AP), the United States Basketball Writers Association (USBWA), and the Women's Basketball Coaches Association (WBCA) for the 2019–20 NCAA Division I women's basketball season. Both AP and USBWA choose three teams, while WBCA lists 10 honorees.

A consensus All-America team in women's basketball has never been organized. This differs from the practice in men's basketball, in which the NCAA uses a combination of selections by AP, USBWA, the National Association of Basketball Coaches (NABC), and Sporting News to determine a consensus All-America team. The selection of a consensus All-America men's basketball team is possible because all four organizations select at least a first and second team, with only the USBWA not selecting a third team.

Before the 2017–18 season, it was impossible for a consensus women's All-America team to be determined because the AP had been the only body that divided its women's selections into separate teams. The USBWA first named separate teams in 2017–18. The women's counterpart to the NABC, the Women's Basketball Coaches Association (WBCA), continues the USBWA's former practice of selecting a single 10-member (plus ties) team. Sporting News does not select an All-America team in women's basketball.

By selector

Associated Press (AP)

AP Honorable Mention 

 Jaylyn Agnew, Creighton
 Bella Alarie, Princeton
 Brittany Brewer, Texas Tech
 Te'a Cooper, Baylor
 Crystal Dangerfield, UConn
 Rennia Davis, Tennessee
 Ciara Duffy, South Dakota
 Kiah Gillespie, Florida State

 Haley Gorecki, Duke
 Vivian Gray, Oklahoma State
 Arella Guirantes, Rutgers
 Ashley Joens, Iowa State
 Stella Johnson, Rider
 Ila Lane, UC Santa Barbara
 Beatrice Mompremier, Miami

 Olivia Nelson-Ododa, UConn 
 Mikayla Pivec, Oregon State
 Lindsey Pulliam, Northwestern
 NaLyssa Smith, Baylor
 Chante Stonewall, DePaul
 Unique Thompson, Auburn
 Kiana Williams, Stanford

United States Basketball Writers Association (USBWA)

Women's Basketball Coaches Association (WBCA)

By player

Academic All-Americans
The College Sports Information Directors of America (CoSIDA) announced its 15-member 2020 Academic All-America team on March 9, 2020, divided into first, second and third teams with Brittany Brewer of Texas Tech chosen as women's college basketball Academic All-American of the Year.

When a player is listed with two grade-point averages, the first is her undergraduate GPA. Players listed with two majors separated by a slash are double majors unless explicitly designated as undergraduate and graduate programs.

Notes:

Senior All-Americans
The finalists for the Senior CLASS Award, called Senior All-Americans, were announced on February 5, 2020. Due to a tie in voting, 11 finalists were named instead of the normal 10. 
On March 31, Sabrina Ionescu was announced as the recipient, with the first and second teams also announced at that time.

First team

Second team

References

All-Americans
NCAA Women's Basketball All-Americans